The Ak 5 or Automatkarbin 5 ("automatic carbine 5", "automatic carbine" being the Swedish term for assault rifle) is the Swedish version of the FN FNC assault rifle with certain modifications, mostly to adapt the weapon to the partially subarctic Swedish climate. The Ak5 is the service rifle of the Swedish Armed Forces. The Ak5 replaced the Ak 4 (a licensed-produced version of the Heckler & Koch G3) in Swedish service. Later versions also accept the Colt M203 grenade launcher attachment. The current standard issue version is the Ak 5C.

In 2021, Sweden announced that they were looking to develop a new rifle in collaboration with Finland, which would replace the Ak5.

History
In the mid-1970s, despite the failure of the Nytt infanterivapen (New Infantry Weapon) program, the Swedish Armed Forces decided to continue to follow the general transition towards smaller calibre ammunition and directed the Försvarets MaterielVerk (FMV) (Defence Materiel Administration) to procure a suitable replacement for the Ak 4 capable of using 5.56×45mm NATO ammunition, which under STANAG4172 is a standard cartridge for NATO forces as well as many non-NATO countries.
The weapon was required to be highly reliable in the subarctic climate of northernmost Sweden, as well as being easy to handle and maintain, while meeting a certain minimum level of accuracy.

From 1975 the FMV evaluated and tested the Colt M16A1, Stoner 63A1, ArmaLite AR-18, Steyr AUG, Beretta M70, IMI Galil, FN FNC, FN CAL, SIG 540, HK33 and FFV 890C (a Swedish Galil variant) 5.56×45mm NATO assault rifles. The FN FNC and FFV 890C were tested in 1979-1980 at infantry regiment I11 in Växjö.

After further testing from 1981-1985 the FMV eventually chose the Belgian FN FNC, which received several modifications. These included a larger trigger guard and cocking handle (to allow for operation while wearing winter gloves, a necessity for temperatures reaching down to ), a larger handguard, a different collapsible shoulder stock, different iron sights and gas block, a modified bolt, deletion of the 3-round burst capability, and a corrosion-resistant green (instead of black) finish. Further the detachable box magazines were modified to be interchangeable with the M16 rifle STANAG magazines. This rifle was finally accepted by the Swedish military as the Ak5 in 1986.

Swedish blank ammunition uses a wooden plug in place of a bullet, so the flash suppressor was fitted with grooves to accept the Swedish blank-firing adaptor, which prevents potentially dangerous pieces of wood from leaving the weapon by smashing the plug into a fine sawdust. The flash suppressor was also designed to accept rifle grenades, although none have been accepted into service. During the troop trials there were an alarming number of complaints by soldiers about damaged teeth from being struck in the mouth by the blank firing adaptor. This was revealed to be caused by the practice of having the weapon slung across the chest rather than the back. Rather than changing this practice (which would reduce the ability of the soldier to rapidly bring the rifle into action), a special plastic cap (later changed to a hard rubber version) was issued to cover the adaptor.

Variants 
The Ak 5 is the Swedish licensed produced version of the FN FNC. Along with its other variants (Ak5B, Ak5C and Ak5D), all respectively have a cyclic rate of fire of around 650–700 rounds per minute(RPM).

CGA5C2
The CGA5C2 (Carl Gustav Automatic Carbine 5 C2) was a prototype model during the evaluation and development of the Ak5 in the late 1970s and early 1980s.

FFV Ak 5

The first versions of the Ak 5 family were made by the Swedish company FFV Ordnance AB (later part of Saab Bofors Dynamics) under license from FN, with deliveries starting in 1986. This version of the Ak5 is still in the inventory of the Swedish Armed Forces, but is no longer issued to soldiers, having been replaced by the Ak5C and Ak5D. This version uses fixed iron sights, and the Swedish Armed Forces have estimated that the maximum practical distance is 400 meters, but it can be used at longer ranges. This brings it in line with the M16, using the Swedish Armed Forces definition of maximum practical distance.

As issued, the Ak 5 did not have a bayonet lug. A bayonet lug adaptor (using the Ak4 bayonet) is fitted to some rifles for ceremonial duties, such as the Royal Guards at the Stockholm Palace.

FFV Ak 5B
The Ak 5B is the designated marksman version of the Ak 5. Modifications include fittings for a 4×25.5 SUSAT L9A1 tritium sight, a cheek pad on the buttstock, and removal of the iron sights. This weapon was typically carried by squad leaders. This version weighs 4.8 kg (without magazine) and 5.4 kg (with full magazine).  Approximately 5200 of this version were made. It is no longer in service.

Bofors Ak 5C

At the beginning of the 21st century the Swedish military wanted a more modern assault rifle for integration in a future Swedish soldier program. The rifle had to have a Rail Integration System, better ergonomics and improved reliability. Instead of purchasing a new assault rifle, Sweden opted to modify the existing Ak5B rifle family already in use reducing program risks and costs.

Before the Ak 5C went into mass production, it was thoroughly evaluated. This was done by having certain units use an experimental model designated Ak5CF where "F" stands for the Swedish word försök (in this context, experiment or trial). During the trial over one million rounds were fired and the rifles exhibited a Mean Rounds Between Stoppage value of 3,500. The test users found the test weapon too heavy and long so the barrel length was reduced to 350 mm to reduce overall weight and move the center of gravity closer to the user. These tests were completed in June 2005 and four months later, the FMV signed a contract with Saab Bofors Dynamics covering the modification of nearly 40,000 Ak5 assault rifles, which took the company approximately four years to implement. Serial deliveries were scheduled to begin in June 2006 and the Ak5C was first issued to priority units serving in Afghanistan (ISAF), Chad (EUFOR Chad/CAR), and Kosovo (KFOR).

The Ak 5C is the modernized version of the original Ak5, following the trend of modular weapons. One of the most significant improvements is the MIL-STD-1913 rail system to which a variety of different optics, lights and sights can be mounted, such as telescopic sights and image intensifiers. The double gas position, iron sights and bolt catch of the original Ak5 rifle family were discarded.

New features of the Ak 5C compared to the original Ak 5:
 Increased reliability Mean Rounds Between Stoppage > 2,000
 Barrel shortened to 
 Weight reduced to 
 MIL-STD-1913 Picatinny rail system at the top and bottom of the hand guard
 Adjustable buttstock
 Foldable emergency iron sights (for ranges up to 300 m)
 Automatic bolt catch
 Ambidextrous selector levers
 Translucent 30-round plastic box magazines
 New slimmer pistol grip at a different angle (similar to the one on Ksp 90)
 Modified hand guard with cut outs for pressure switches and cables on the right and left side
 Forward vertical grip at 6 o'clock position (detachable)
 New prong-type flash suppressor
 Tactical sling (nylon)
 Fire selector on both sides of the rifle.

The Aimpoint CS red dot sight with a 4 MOA red dot reticle was chosen as the standard optical sight for the Ak5C. Other day or night aiming optics can also be mounted on the MIL-STD-1913 Picatinny rail system.

There has been some confusion about the M203 grenade launcher. While the Ak5C is prepared to accept the launcher, the correct designation (translated from Swedish) would be "Ak 5[version] with grenade attachment" for the combination. The bayonet-lug adapter for the Ak4 bayonet is not used with the Ak5C. Instead a new bayonet for ceremonial use only was issued to the troops. This bayonet is attached to the 6 o'clock rail on the hand guard.

The Ak 5C is now the standard-issue rifle of the Swedish armed forces, and production of the A and B versions are currently discontinued and existing stock put in storage.

Bofors Ak 5D

The Ak 5D has a shortened barrel and handguard. It also features the MIL-STD-1913 rail system for easy mounting of a variety of sights.

Due to the smaller dimensions of the carbine, the Ak 5D is especially suited for ranger/urban warfare units and vehicle crews who often benefit from a more lightweight and compact weapon when taking into account the nature of their assignments and the environments in which they often operate. The Swedish Police have used a version of the Ak5D; see below.

The newest Ak 5D Mk2 version has the same upgrades as the "C" model but retains the shorter barrel.

CGA5P
Some units of the Swedish Police have used a special version of the Ak 5D called CGA5P or sometimes (incorrectly) Ak5DP. Essentially it is a black (instead of the regular military green) Ak5D with automatic fire capability disabled by a hex screw, which can be removed if automatic fire is needed. Unlike the Ak5D, the police version has fixed sights but is still equipped with the MIL-STD-1913 rail system to allow the use of telescopic sights or red dot sights. Unlike its military counterparts (except for the Ak5C/D versions), the police version has safety catches on both sides of the weapon.

Users 
 : Norwegian Police
 : Service rifle of the Swedish Armed Forces since 1987.

See also
 Pindad SS1 - Indonesian assault rifle also derived from the FNC.

References

External links

 World Guns - Bofors AK-5 assault rifle (Sweden)
 Buddy Hinton FNC/AK5 Picture Collection (photo directory)
 Automatkarbin 5 - SoldF.com (in Swedish)
 Automatkarbin 5C - SoldF.com (in Swedish)
 Ak 5 - Göta Vapenhistoriska Sällskapet (in Swedish)
 FMV lägger beställning på modifiering av automatvapen (press release in Swedish)
 The Swedish ak 5 upgrade program Presentation to "NDIA Small Arms Systems Symposium" May 18, 2006 by Per G. Arvidsson, Product Manager Small Arms Systems Försvarets Materielverk (Swedish Defence Materiel Administration)

5.56×45mm NATO assault rifles
Carbines
Weapons and ammunition introduced in 1986
Assault rifles of Sweden